Events from the year 1956 in Taiwan, Republic of China. This year is numbered Minguo 45 according to the official Republic of China calendar.

Incumbents 
 President – Chiang Kai-shek
 Vice President – Chen Cheng
 Premier – Yu Hung-chun
 Vice Premier – Huang Shao-ku

Events

July
 16 July – The streamlining of Fujian Province Government.

August
 1 August – The establishment of Fuxing Broadcasting Station.

Births
 22 February – Lu Kuo-hua, Magistrate of Yilan County (2005–2009)
 2 March – Chen Hung-chang, member of Legislative Yuan (1993–2005)
 5 March – Sung Yu-hsieh, Deputy Minister of National Development Council (2014)
 13 March – Kuo Yao-chi, Minister of Transportation and Communications (2006)
 15 May – Yang Chiu-hsing, Magistrate of Kaohsiung County (2001–2010)
 24 May – Teng Chia-chi, Deputy Mayor of Taipei
 21 June – Lee Hong-yuan, Minister of the Interior (2012–2014)
 7 July – Pu Tze-chun, Vice Minister of National Defense (2017-2018)
 20 July – Su Huan-chih, Magistrate of Tainan County (2001–2010)
 14 August – Lo Chih-tsung, head coach of Chinese Taipei national football team (1985–1988, 2009–2011)
 15 August – Kuan Chung-ming, Minister of National Development Council (2014–2015)
 24 August – Chu T’ien-wen, writer
 30 August – King Pu-tsung, Secretary-General of National Security Council (2014–2015)
 23 September – Chen Liang-gee, Political Deputy Minister of Education
 29 September – Akio Chen, actor
 10 October – Huang Fu-yuan, Minister of Directorate-General of Personnel Administration (2012–2016)
 22 October – Su Jia-chyuan, President of the Legislative Yuan
 16 December – Sra Kacaw, member of Legislative Yuan
 9 December – Kuan Bi-ling, member of Legislative Yuan

References

 
Years of the 20th century in Taiwan